In cryptography, CRYPTON is a symmetric block cipher submitted as a candidate for the Advanced Encryption Standard (AES). It is very efficient in hardware implementations and was designed by Chae Hoon Lim of Future Systems Inc.

The CRYPTON algorithm processes blocks of 128 bits in the form of 4×4 byte arrays. The round transformation consists of four steps: byte-wise substitution, column-wise bit permutation, column-to-row transposition and finally key addition. CRYPTON uses 12 rounds of this encryption process. Due to the algorithm's nature, the decryption process can be made identical to the encryption process using a different key.

See also
 AES process

External links
 Hardware Design and Performance Estimation of The 128-bit Block Cipher CRYPTON by Eunjong Hong, Jai-Hoon Chung, Chae Hoon Lim
 SCAN's entry for CRYPTON version 0.5 as originally submitted as AES candidate to NIST
 CRYPTON: A New 128-bit Block Cipher - Specification and Analysis (Version 0.5) by Chae Hoon Lim, Hyo Sun Hwang
 CRYPTON: A New 128-bit Block Cipher - Specification and Analysis (Version 1.0) by Chae Hoon Lim, Hyo Sun Hwang
 Weak Keys of CRYPTON by Johan Borst, 28 Aug 1998. Response to call for comments on AES candidates. Retrieved 2014-01-23.
 CRYPTON 1.0 Delphi implementation

Block ciphers